The SCW Tag Team Championship was a professional wrestling championship promoted by Steel City Wrestling (SCW).  The title was the main tag team championship of the SCW promotion. It was the first-ever championship established in SCW, having been introduced in 1994, in the finals of a tournament.

The inaugural champions were Lou Marconi and Derek Stone, who defeated Beauty & The Beast (Frank Stalletto and Futureshock) in a tournament final on September 24, 1994, to become the first SCW Tag Team Champions. No team won the title more than once. At 406 days,  reign is the longest in the title's history, while the team of Frank Stalletto and Stevie Richards' first reign was the shortest, at less than one day. Overall, there were 11 reigns among 11 teams, with three vacancies, and 1 deactivation.

Title history
Key

References
General

Specific

External links
SCW Tag Team Championship at Cagematch.net
SCW Tag Team Championship at Wrestlingdata.com

Tag team wrestling championships
Steel City Wrestling